Misguided is Argyle Park's only album under that name. The album was released on March 21, 1995, by R.E.X. Records into the Christian rock market, and sits alongside other early 90s work by Circle of Dust and Mortal as being instrumental in introducing industrial music to the Christian music scene. The album was nominated for Best Metal/Hard Rock Album at the 27th Annual GMA Dove Awards in 1996.

Misguided is a diverse album that combines elements such as techno, metal guitar, ragtime piano, horns, samples, and dark vocals. Members cited influences such as Portishead and jazz being responsible for the experimentation on the album. It also features a wide variety of guest appearances by other alternative Christian bands and mainstream industrial bands of the mid 90s. The lyrics generally center around themes of betrayal, bitterness, and emotional pain, with band members and associates at various times hinting that the album was acting as catharsis for a child abuse situation at the church they all attended while growing up. The resultant thematic darkness of the album caused its reception to be mixed, with many Christian listeners protesting the lack of positive content, even going so far as to call it "anti-Christian". R.E.X. themselves attempted to censor the band before the album's release, deeming the outro verse of the song "Doomsayer" as being too controversial and cutting it from the song. The band, however, inserted the cut snippet onto the end of the album master tape before R.E.X. noticed and the outro now appears as a hidden track at the very end of the CD. The controversy and backlash caused the band members to shut Argyle Park down two years after conception.

Tommy Victor of Prong wrote the main riff for the song "Doomsayer", and later used this same riff in the Prong song "Controller". Originally released on R.E.X. Records, the album was re-issued as a limited run in 2005 by Retroactive Records with bonus tracks, additional booklet information, and enhanced ROM material on the disc.

Track listing 

Note: Following track 18, there are 3 hidden tracks and 13 silent tracks. The final hidden track, Track 34, is a spoken word piece intended as the true ending to the song "Doomsayer".

Vinyl pressing 
There were only four pressings of the album on vinyl (technically acetates), all of which were given to members of the band. One of these acetates was eventually purchased by a fan, who confirmed on the (now-defunct) FiXT Forums that the vinyl edition of the album contains a bonus track, named "Babylon", which is not on the CD version of Misguided. This same song ended up being included on Klay Scott's 1998 Circle of Dust album Disengage, and presumably would have been one of the songs included on Buka's Backwoods Records compilation.

Release history

Contributors 

Most of the contributors to Misguided appeared under aliases or alternate spellings of their commonly known names. Their real identities, if known, are listed here.

Main members 
 Buka: alias of Chris Martello, at the time a producer at MTV Sports.
 Deathwish and Dred: aliases of Klayton, who also produced the album using the name Celldweller

Guest appearances 
 Jim Thirlwell of Foetus, Wiseblood, Steroid Maximus, and Manorexia - narration on "Refuge"
 Klank: Daren Diolosa of Circle of Dust, Klank, and Left Out - vocals on "Headscrew"
 Gyro: Jyro Xhan of Mortal and Fold Zandura - vocals and shouts on "Agony"
 Tedd Cookerly, of Every Day Life - shouts on "Agony"
 Lauren Boquette of Drown - vocals on "Leave Me Alone"
 Marco Forcone of Drown - extra percussion on "Leave Me Alone"
 Tommy Victor of Prong, Teenage Time Killers, Ministry, Danzig, and Tapeworm - vocals on "Skin Shed", guitar and bass on "Doomsayer"
 King Salomon: Mark Salomon of Stavesacre, The Crucified, Neon Horse, White Lighter - vocals on "Headscrew", "Doomsayer" and "Fanny Pack"
 Dirk Lemmenes of Focused and Stavesacre - shouts on "Agony", vocals on "Gutterboy (I Am I Am)"
 Jeff Bellew of CHATTERBoX, Stavesacre, and The Crucified - shouts on "Agony", vocals on "Gutterboy"
 Evol Eye Jeni: Jeni of Sill - vocals on "Violent"
 Keith Corp - horns on "Futile"
 Christy Sweet - vocals on "Headscrew" and "Circle"
 Alabama King Fish: Chris Donahue of Circle of Dust and Vigilantes of Love - bass on "Agony", piano on "Leave Me Alone"
 Og: John Lopez of Circle of Dust - performer and writer of "Og"

Recording personnel 
 Celldweller - Producer, audio engineer, mixing engineer
 Vin Syrek - Mixing engineer, digital editing
 Bob Moon - Engineering
 Duncan Standbury - Mastering
 Jeff - Album artwork

References 

Argyle Park albums
1995 debut albums
R.E.X. Records albums